Liberty Peak is the name given to the officially unnamed mountain peak west of Liberty Pass in the Ruby Mountains of Elko County, Nevada, United States. It is located within the Ruby Mountains Wilderness of the Humboldt-Toiyabe National Forest. The peak rises from the head of Lamoille Canyon, and is a major part of the view at the Road's End Trailhead. To the southeast are Liberty Lake and Kleckner Canyon, while to the northwest is Box Canyon.

Summit panorama

References

External links

Ruby Mountains
Mountains of Nevada
Mountains of Elko County, Nevada
Humboldt–Toiyabe National Forest